Gregory James Schaum (January 1, 1954 – July 1, 2021) was a former American football defensive end in the National Football League for the Dallas Cowboys and New England Patriots. He played college football at Michigan State University.

Early years
Schaum attended the Baltimore Polytechnic Institute, where he lettered in football, wrestling and lacrosse. In football, he was a two-way tackle and was named All-American as a senior.  

He accepted a football scholarship from Michigan State University, where he was a three-year starter at right defensive tackle.

In 2007, he was inducted into the Maryland State Athletic Hall of Fame.

Professional career

Dallas Cowboys
Schaum was selected by the Dallas Cowboys in the seventh round (186th overall) of the 1976 NFL Draft. As a rookie, he was a backup defensive end, playing in 12 games. On September 7, 1977, he was placed on the injured reserve list with a knee injury. He was waived on August 28, 1978.

New England Patriots
On September 7, 1978, he was signed as a free agent by the New England Patriots, to provide depth after Greg Boyd and Julius Adams suffered injuries. He appeared in 14 games as a backup defensive end. He was released on August 20, 1979.

References

1954 births
2021 deaths
Players of American football from Baltimore
American football defensive ends
Michigan State Spartans football players
Dallas Cowboys players
New England Patriots players